Martin Andreas Nowak (born April 7, 1965) is an Austrian-born professor of mathematical biology, at Harvard University since 2003. He is one of the leading researchers in the field that studies the role of cooperation in evolution. Nowak has held professorships in Oxford and Princeton before being recruited to Harvard in 2003 when Jeffrey Epstein donated a large sum of money to set up a center for studying cooperation in evolution. 

Nowak's best known work outside of academia is his 2011 book SuperCooperators: Altruism, Evolution and Why We Need Each Other to Succeed. This book is partly an autobiography and partly a popular presentation of his work in mathematical biology on the evolution of cooperation. In the book Nowak also wrote favorably about his interactions with Jeffrey Epstein, who had donated to Harvard to enable the creation of an institute headed by Nowak. In 2020 Nowak was disciplined by being suspended from teaching for two years and having his institute permanently closed down as a punishment for having continued to let Epstein access the university's Graduate School of Arts and Sciences ten years after his conviction for sex crimes.

Early life and education
Nowak was born April 7, 1965 in Vienna, Austria.  He studied at Albertus Magnus Gymnasium and the University of Vienna, earning a doctorate in biochemistry and mathematics in 1989. He worked with Peter Schuster on quasi-species theory and with Karl Sigmund on evolution of cooperation. Nowak received the highest Austrian honors (Sub auspiciis Praesidentis) when awarded his degree.

Career
From 1989 to 1998, Nowak worked at the University of Oxford with Robert May as an Erwin Schrödinger postdoctoral Scholar and Wellcome Trust Senior Research Fellow. From 1997 to 1998, Nowak was a professor of mathematical biology. After 1998, he conducted research at the Institute for Advanced Study at Princeton and established a program in theoretical biology. 

In 2003, Nowak was recruited to Harvard University as Professor of Mathematics and Biology. He was appointed Director of the Program for Evolutionary Dynamics (PED). The PED was funded with a total nine  million dollars from the Jeffrey Epstein VI Foundation, In 2003, Epstein had introduced himself as a science philanthropist supporter of Nowak's work, cementing the initial interaction with a large donation to Harvard. Scientific American reported that Nowak's team received US$6.5 million initially, with nothing released to him after 2007, a couple of hundred thousand dollars remained unspent.

Nowak has authored books and scientific papers on topics in evolutionary game theory, cancer, viruses, infectious disease, the evolution of language, and the evolution of cooperation.
His first book, Virus Dynamics (written with Robert May) was published by Oxford University Press in 2001. Nowak is a corresponding member of the Austrian Academy of Sciences. He won the Weldon Memorial Prize, the Albert Wander Prize, the Akira Okubo Prize, the David Starr Jordan Prize and the Henry Dale Prize.  Nowak's 2006 book Evolutionary Dynamics: Exploring the Equations of Life earned him praise from other scientists along with the R.R. Hawkins Award for the Outstanding Professional, Reference or Scholarly Work of 2006 from the Association of American Publishers.

Nowak was co-director with Sarah Coakley of the Evolution and Theology of Cooperation project at Harvard University, sponsored by the Templeton Foundation. where he was also a member of their Board of Advisers. In a lecture given at Harvard in March 2007 called "Evolution and Christianity", Nowak, a Roman Catholic, argued that "Science and religion are two essential components in the search for truth. Denying either is a barren approach."

Harvard University placed Nowak on paid academic leave on May 1, 2020 because of his failure to disaffiliate with Jeffrey Epstein after his conviction. Nevertheless Harvard had declined a donation from Epstein in 2013.  A report commissioned by the university found that Nowak allowed Epstein to visit the PED offices more than 40 times after his conviction, to maintain an office with a phone line and webpage, and to interact with students at PED. In 2021, Harvard decided a proportionate response to the severity of Nowak's ethical errors was the closing of the institute founded with Epstein's money, the donation of the balance of the money remaining to a foundation helping victims of sexual assaults, and a two year ban on Nowak lecturing and doing research. He will also have his interaction with students limited. Nowak said he would "take the lessons from this time with me as I move forward".

Academic research
In 1990, Nowak and Robert May proposed a mathematical model which explained the puzzling delay between HIV infection and AIDS in terms of the evolution of different strains of the virus during individual infections, to the point where the genetic diversity of the virus reaches a threshold whereby the immune system can no longer control it. This detailed quantitative approach depended on assumptions about the biology of HIV which were subsequently confirmed by experiment.

In a paper in Science in 2006, Nowak enunciated and unified the mathematical rules for the five understood bases of the evolution of cooperation (kin selection, direct reciprocity, indirect reciprocity, network reciprocity, and group selection). Nowak suggests that evolution is constructive because of cooperation, and that we might add “natural cooperation” as a third fundamental principle of evolution beside mutation and natural selection.

In a paper featured on the front cover of Nature in 2007, Nowak and colleagues demonstrated that the transition of irregular verbs to regular verbs in English over time obeys a simple inverse-square law, thus providing one of the first quantitative laws in the evolution of language.

In 2010 a paper by Nowak, E. O. Wilson, and Corina Tarnita, in Nature, argued that standard natural selection theory represents a simpler and superior approach to kin selection theory in the evolution of eusociality. This work has led to many comments including strong criticism from proponents of inclusive fitness theory. Nowak maintains that the findings of the paper are conclusive and that the field of social evolution should move beyond inclusive fitness theory.

He has over 300 scientific publications, of which 40 are in Nature and 15 in Science.

Nowak's research interests include:
 Somatic evolution of cancer, genetic instability, tumor suppressor genes
 Stem cells, tissue architecture
 Viruses, infectious diseases, immunology
 Dynamics of prion infections
 Quasispecies
 Genetic redundancy
 Evolution of language
 Evolutionary game theory
 Evolutionary graph theory
 Evolution of cooperation
 Prelife and origins of life

Supercooperators
In 2011, Nowak’s book Supercooperators: The Mathematics of Evolution, Altruism and Human Behaviour (Or, Why We Need Each Other to Succeed) was published, co-authored with Roger Highfield.

Manfred Milinski in Nature describes the book as "part autobiography, part textbook, and reads like a best-selling novel" and suggests that whereas Nowak is right that the theories of kin selection and punishment need revisiting, it is too soon to tell whether his bold ideas will hold up to empirical testing. On the Nowak/Tarnita/Wilson paper Milinski says:  "I anticipate that a better mathematical formulation of social evolution theory will be found that includes relatedness, is compatible with existing evidence and includes Hamilton's rule as a rule of thumb."

David Willetts, in the Financial Times, described the book as an "excellent example" of using the nexus of evolutionary biology, game theory and neuroscience to understand the development of cooperation in society, and suggests that "all politicians can draw inspiration and ideas from the intellectual resources of this exciting approach"

References

External links
 
 Program for Evolutionary Dynamics, Harvard University
 Scientist at Work | Martin Nowak. In Games, an Insight Into the Rules of Evolution, The New York Times, 31 July 2007
 Martin Nowak: Extended film interview with transcript for the 'Why Are We Here?' documentary series.

1965 births
Christian scholars
Living people
Fellows of Wolfson College, Oxford
Evolutionary biologists
University of Vienna alumni
Harvard University faculty
Austrian Roman Catholics
Theistic evolutionists
Austrian mathematicians
Austrian biochemists